Matthew Feldman (born 1977) is an Anglo-American historian and political scientist. As Emeritus Professor in the Modern History of Ideas at Teesside University, and Professorial Fellow at the University of York, Feldman specializes in fascism and the far right in Europe and the United States. He consults on neo-Nazi terrorism, hate crimes and radical right extremism for Academic Consulting Services.

Feldman is the author of several books on political extremism, and on Samuel Beckett, including Politics, Intellectuals and Faith (2020); Falsifying Beckett (2015); Ezra Pound's Fascist Propaganda, 1935–1945 (2013); and Beckett's Books (2006).

Education
Born in California, Feldman was awarded a BA in modern history and English in 1999, an MA in the history of fascism in 2000, and a PhD in 2004 for a thesis entitled "Sourcing 'Aporetics': An Empirical Study on Philosophical Influences in the Development of Samuel Beckett's Writings". All his degrees were completed at Oxford Brookes University.

Career
After teaching history part-time at Oxford Brookes and the University of Northampton, Feldman was appointed in 2008 as senior lecturer in 20th-century history at Northampton. In 2012 he became Reader in Contemporary History at Teesside and in June 2014 Professor in the Modern History of Ideas. As of 2017 he was co-director of Teesside's Centre for Fascist, Anti-fascist and Post-fascist Studies (CFAPS).

Selected works
(2020) with Steven Matthews (eds.). Samuel Beckett's 'Philosophy Notes'''. Oxford: Oxford University Press. 
(2020). Politics, Intellectuals and Faith: Essays by Martin Feldman. Stuttgart: Columbia University Press/Ibidem Press. 
(2017) with Jorge Dagnino and Paul Stocker (eds.). The 'New Man' in Radical Right Ideology and Practice, 1919–1945. London: Bloomsbury.
(2015). Falsifying Beckett: Essays on Archives, Philosophy, and Methodology in Beckett Studies. Stuttgart: Columbia University Press/Ibidem Press.
(2014) with Paul Jackson (eds.). Doublespeak: The Rhetoric of the Far-Right since 1945. Stuttgart: Columbia University Press/Ibidem Press.
(2013). Ezra Pound's Fascist Propaganda, 1935–1945. Basingstoke: Palgrave Macmillan.Marsh, Alec (September 2014). "Matthew Feldman: Ezra Pound's Fascist Propaganda, 1935-1945". Make It New: The Ezra Pound Society Magazine, Volume 1.
(2008) with Marius Turda and  Tudor Georgescu (eds.). Clerical Fascism in Interwar Europe. London: Routledge.
(2006). Beckett's Books: A Cultural History of the Interwar Notes. London: Bloomsbury/Continuum. 
(2004) with Roger Griffin (eds.). Fascism: Critical Concepts in Political Science''. Vol 1–5. London: Routledge.

References

Further reading
Feldman, Mattew and Alchorn, William (14 May 2019). "Why we’re analysing radical-right narratives". openDemocracy.
"The Evolution of the Radical Right: An Interview with Matthew Feldman". Oxford Research Group, 11 February 2019.

1977 births
21st-century British historians
Academics of Teesside University
Alumni of Oxford Brookes University
Living people